White Tiger is a 1923 American silent crime film directed by Tod Browning starring Priscilla Dean and featuring Wallace Beery in a supporting role.

Cast

Theme
In White Tiger, Browning, a former magician, provides an exposé of the “mystifying mechanics” of the famous  chess-playing automaton widely exhibited in late 18th and early 19th century Europe and America. The automaton fashioned to represent a Turkish chess master was an often convincing—though entirely fraudulent—representation of artificial intelligence: the device was actually operated by a human chess expert concealed within the cabinet below the chess board.
Browning, a great admirer of Edgar Allan Poe, combined Poe’s famous 1836 essay on the hoax with the author’s fascination with tales of mystery and the macabre.

The protagonists in White Tiger use the “baffling” device to gain entrance to a wealthy estate and execute a jewel heist. In exposing the fraud, Browning violates a precept of the magician's code of ethics; to never reveal the mechanics of an illusion.

Footnotes

References
Eaker, Alfred. 2016. Tod Browning Retrospective  Retrieved 26 February 2021.
Sobchack, Vivian. 2006. "The Films of Tod Browning: An Overview Long Past" in The Films of Tod Browning, editor Bernd Herzogenrath, 2006 Black Dog Publishing. London. pp. 21–39. 
Solomon, Matthew. 2006. "Staging Deception: Theatrical Illusionism in the Browning Films of the 1920s" in The Films of Tod Browning, editor Bernd Herzogenrath, 2006 Black Dog Publishing. London. pp. 49–67

External links

White Tiger lantern slide plate (Wayback Machine)
Film stills and lobby card at silentfilmstillarchive.com
 (81 min. version)

1923 films
1923 crime drama films
American silent feature films
American black-and-white films
American crime drama films
Films directed by Tod Browning
Universal Pictures films
1920s American films
Silent American drama films